Barry McDonald (born 17 September 1971) is an Irish gymnast. He competed at the 1996 Summer Olympics.

References

External links
 

1971 births
Living people
Irish male artistic gymnasts
Olympic gymnasts of Ireland
Gymnasts at the 1996 Summer Olympics
Place of birth missing (living people)